The men's épée was one of seven fencing events on the Fencing at the 1928 Summer Olympics programme. It was the seventh appearance of the event. The competition was held from 6 August 1928 to 7 August 1928. 59 fencers from 22 nations competed. Each nation could have up to three fencers. The event was won by Lucien Gaudin of France, the nation's third victory in the individual men's épée—taking sole possession of most among nations above Cuba and Belgium, each at two. Gaudin was the second man to win both the foil and épée events at a single Games. It was the third consecutive Games at which France reached the podium in the event. Two Frenchman had reached the head-to-head final; Gaudin won over Georges Buchard, who received silver. Bronze in 1928 went to American George Calnan, the nation's first medal in the event.

Background
This was the seventh appearance of the event, which was not held at the first Games in 1896 (with only foil and sabre events held) but has been held at every Summer Olympics since 1900.

Six of the 12 finalists from the 1924 Games returned: gold medalist (and 1920 finalist) Charles Delporte of Belgium, bronze medalist Nils Hellsten of Sweden, fifth-place finisher (and 1920 gold medalist) Armand Massard of France, seventh-place finisher Georges Buchard of France, seventh-place finisher Léon Tom of Belgium, and ninth-place finisher Peter Ryefelt of Denmark. Buchard was the reigning (1927) World Champion; his countryman Lucien Gaudin was the 1921 World Champion. The two were favored in the event. 

Bulgaria, Chile, Finland, Mexico, and Romania each made their debut in the event. Belgium, Great Britain, and the United States each appeared for the sixth time, tied for most among nations.

Competition format

The competition format was unusual. It began with the same general four-round, pool-play format in use since 1908 (though with some modifications). However, it added an "extra final" medal round which placed the top four finishers in the "final" into a single-elimination bracket with a bronze medal bout. In each round before the "extra final", each pool held a round-robin; however, the number of touches changed by round. Double-touches counted as touches against both fencers, and both fencers could lose a bout if a double-touch resulted in each reaching the prescribed number of touches against. There were no barrages.

 First round: 6 pools of between 9 and 10 fencers each. Bouts were to 1 touch. The 6 fencers in each pool with the most wins advanced to the quarterfinals.
 Quarterfinals: 3 pools of 12 fencers each. Bouts were to 1 touch. The 6 fencers in each pool with the most wins advanced to the semifinals. 
 Semifinals: 2 pools of 9 fencers each. Bouts were to 2 touches. The 5 fencers in each pool with the most wins advanced to the final.
 Final: 1 pool of 10 fencers. Bouts were to 2 touches. The top 4 fencers advanced to the "extra final" medal round.
 Extra final: A four-fencer, single-elimination bracket. The #1 seed faced the #4 seed, and the #2 vs. the #3 in a semifinal round. The winners of those two bouts reached the gold medal final, while the losers of the two semifinals went to the bronze medal bout.

Schedule

Results
Source: Official results; De Wael

Round 1

Each pool was a round-robin. Bouts were to one touch, with double-losses possible. The top six fencers in each pool advanced to the second round.

Pool A

Pool B

Pool C

Pool D

Pool E

Pool F

Quarterfinals

Each pool was a round-robin. Bouts were to one touch, with double-losses possible. The top six fencers in each pool advanced to the semifinals.

Quarterfinal A

Quarterfinal B

Quarterfinal C

Semifinals

Each pool was a round-robin. Bouts were to two touches, with double-losses possible. The top five fencers in each pool advanced to the final.

Semifinal A

Semifinal B

Final

The final was a round-robin. Bouts were to two touches, with double-losses possible. The top four advanced to the "extra final" or medal round.

Extra final

The "extra final" round was a two-round single elimination tournament with a third-place match: that is, the four fencers competed in two semifinals, with the winners playing a gold medal bout and the losers playing a bronze medal bout. The bouts were to 10 touches, but the winner had to win by at least 2 or the bout continued.

Results summary

References

Epee men
Men's events at the 1928 Summer Olympics